Amangeldy Mursadıkoviç Muraliev (born August 7, 1947) is a Kyrgyz politician. He was the chairman of executive committee of council of people's deputies (i.e. the city's mayor) in Frunze in 1988–91, minister of economy and finance in 1991–92, chairman of the State Committee on Economy in 1993–94, chairman of the State Property Fund in 1994–96, governor of Osh Province in 1996–1999, Prime Minister of Kyrgyzstan from April 13, 1999, to December 21, 2000, and president of the Kyrgyz Stock Exchange in 2001–04.

External links
Amangeldy Muraliev at Radio Free Europe

1947 births
Living people
Prime Ministers of Kyrgyzstan
Finance ministers of Kyrgyzstan
Mayors of places in Kyrgyzstan
Government ministers of Kyrgyzstan